Cornone di Blumone is a mountain of Lombardy, Italy, It has an elevation of 2,843 metres.

Mountains of the Alps
Mountains of Lombardy